Lisa Daniels is a writer and former correspondent for NBC News.

Career 
Daniels graduated first in her class from Hamilton College, majoring in math and history. She graduated cum laude from Harvard Law School. Before starting her broadcasting career, Daniels worked as an associate with the New York law firm Davis Polk & Wardwell.

Early in her career, Daniels was an evening anchor at WGGB-TV in Springfield, Massachusetts. She later hosted "CBS 2 News Saturday/Sunday Morning" for WCBS-TV in New York, where she won the Emmy Award for her coverage of the Northeast Blackout of 2003. Daniels was also a daytime anchor on MSNBC Live and a regular substitute host on The Abrams Report.

She is currently a writer, contributing articles to publications like the Huffington Post among others. She is married and lives in New York City.

References

External links
 

Hamilton College (New York) alumni
Harvard Law School alumni
Living people
American television personalities
American women television personalities
NBC News people
American women journalists
Year of birth missing (living people)
Davis Polk & Wardwell lawyers
21st-century American women